Acalolepta tugelensis is a species of beetle in the family Cerambycidae. It was described by Stephan von Breuning in 1970. It is known from the Solomon Islands.

References

Acalolepta
Beetles described in 1970